Daniel Pettersson (born 6 May 1992) is a Swedish handball player for SC Magdeburg and the Swedish national team.

He made international debut on the Swedish national team in March 2014, against Germany.

He participated at the 2020 European Men's Handball Championship in Sweden. He also participated in bringing home the silver medal for Sweden in the 2021 World Men's Handball Championship, and gold medal in the 2022 European Men's Handball Championship.

Honours 
Handball-Bundesliga:
: 2022
EHF European League:
: 2021
: 2022
: 2017, 2018
IHF Super Globe:
: 2021, 2022

References

External links

1992 births
Living people
People from Eskilstuna
Swedish male handball players
Eskilstuna Guif players
Expatriate handball players
Swedish expatriate sportspeople in Germany
Handball-Bundesliga players
Handball players at the 2020 Summer Olympics
Olympic handball players of Sweden
Sportspeople from Södermanland County
SC Magdeburg players
21st-century Swedish people